Éric Chéli (born 20 August 1966) is a French former racing driver.

References

1966 births
Living people
French racing drivers
International Formula 3000 drivers
Place of birth missing (living people)
20th-century French people